Descolea is a genus of fungi in the family Bolbitiaceae. Described by mycologist Rolf Singer in 1952, the widespread genus contains about 15 species. It was formerly placed in the family Cortinariaceae because of its limoniform basidiospores and its ectomycorrhizal lifestyle. A 2013 molecular phylogenetics study by Tóth et al. found it to be closely related to the genus Pholiotina The genus Pseudodescolea, erected for the single Descolea-like species Pseudodescolea lepiotiformis, was formerly considered distinct until a 1990 study found it to be a synonym of Descolea antarctica.

The genus name of Descolea is in honour of Horacio Raúl Descole (1910-1984), who was an Argentine apothecary, biochemist and botanist.

Species

See also
List of Agaricales genera

References

Bolbitiaceae
Agaricales genera
Taxa named by Rolf Singer